Gérard Delbeke (1 September 1903 – 22 October 1977) was a Belgian footballer.

He was a midfielder for Club brugeois, spending eight seasons in the first team. He played one international match for Belgium, on 20 July 1930, during the first World Cup in Montevideo, against Paraguay (lost, 1–0).

In 1933, he retired, and took over as coach with the mission to return club brugeois to the élite. He succeeded in his mission, and continued to manage the Blauw-Zwart through the Second World War.

Honours 
 International in 1930 (1 cap during the 1930 World Cup)

References

External links
 

Belgian footballers
Belgium international footballers
1930 FIFA World Cup players
Club Brugge KV players
Belgian football managers
Club Brugge KV head coaches
1903 births
1977 deaths
Association football midfielders